WBLT (1350 kHz) is a commercial AM radio station licensed to Bedford, Virginia, serving Bedford County, Virginia.  WBLT broadcasts a sports radio format and is owned and operated by Three Daughters Media.  Most programming comes from ESPN Radio.

By day, WBLT is powered at 5,000 watts non-directional.  But to protect other stations on 1350 AM at night, WBLT reduces power to only 47 watts.  Programming is also heard on 100-watt FM translator W283FH at 95.5 MHz.

Notes

References

External links
 ESPN Radio in Virginia Online

1950 establishments in Virginia
Sports radio stations in the United States
Radio stations established in 1950
BLT
ESPN Radio stations